Antacocha (possibly from Quechua anta copper, qucha lake, "copper lake") is a lake in Peru located in the Junín Region, Junín Province, Junín District. It lies east of Lake Junin and northwest of Alcacocha at an elevation of

See also
List of lakes in Peru

References

Lakes of Peru
Lakes of Junín Region